Kickboxing, for the 2013 World Combat Games were held at the Yubileiny - Sports Complex 'Yubileiny' Halls 1 and 2 in Saint Petersburg, Russia. The preliminary rounds took place on 21 and 23 October 2013. Medals were awarded on the 25 October 2013.

Medal table
Key:

Medal summary

Men

Women

References

External links

Kickboxing events
2013 World Combat Games events